The Rhodesian Front (RF) was a right-wing, conservative political party in Southern Rhodesia, subsequently known as Rhodesia. It was the last ruling party of Southern Rhodesia prior to the country's unilateral declaration of independence, and the ruling party of Rhodesia from 1965 until 1979. Led first by Winston Field, and, from 1964, by Ian Smith, the Rhodesian Front was the successor to the Dominion Party, which was the main opposition party in Southern Rhodesia when the territory was a part of the Federation of Rhodesia and Nyasaland. The RF was formed in March 1962 by conservative white Rhodesians who opposed decolonization and majority rule. It carried the general election in Southern Rhodesia that December, and remained in power until 1979.

History and ideology
The RF had fifteen founding principles, which included the preservation of each racial group's right to maintain its own identity, the preservation of "proper standards" through a policy of advancement through merit, the maintenance of the Land Apportionment Act, which formalized the racial imbalance in the ownership and distribution of land, opposition to compulsory racial integration, job protection for white workers, and the practice of Christianity. Historians have generally defined the party as conservative and wanting to maintain white Rhodesian interests by staunchly opposing majority rule, which the RF argued (citing other post-colonial African nations as examples) would lead to a collapse in economic development, law and order, and the emergence of a communist regime in Rhodesia. The party also encouraged the emigration of whites from other African former colonies to Rhodesia. In contrast to the ideology of the South African National Party, the RF allowed for democratic opposition and did not advocate social apartheid (under the RF, marriage, relationships and intermingling between whites and non-white persons was possible and legal, albeit uncommon). Black Rhodesians were allowed to vote for candidates on separate and smaller electoral rolls in parliamentary elections following the UDI. However, the RF wanted to continue the maintenance of the government's right to provide separate amenities for different races, such as education and public sector resources, and maintained an all-white membership, which resulted in it facing accusations of racism from both within Rhodesia and abroad. Smith and the RF also claimed that they based their policies, ideas, and democratic principles on merit and "not on color or nationalism." The party also claimed that a system of merit and separate economic advancement would ultimately result in an "equal partnership between black and white" as an alternative to majority rule. In 1977, the party had a schism in which the more hardline wing broke off to form the Rhodesian Action Party, which opposed Smith's proposals to negotiate a settlement with black nationalist leaders.

In the elections leading to the country's independence in 1980, as the Republic of Zimbabwe, the RF won all 20 parliamentary seats reserved for whites in the power-sharing agreement that it had forged. On 6 June 1981, the party changed its name to the Republican Front, and on 21 July 1984, it became the Conservative Alliance of Zimbabwe. Eleven of its 20 parliamentarians defected over the following four years, but the party again won 15 of the 20 parliamentary seats reserved for whites in the 1985 election. In 1986, the CAZ opened its membership to Zimbabweans of all races. In 1987 the ruling government abolished all reserved seats for whites. When these were abolished many white MPs became independents or joined the ruling ZANU–PF party.

Electoral history

House of Assembly elections

See also

 Politics of Rhodesia

Further reading
Rhodesians Never Die, Godwin, P. & Hancock, I., 1995. Baobab Books, Harare, Zimbabwe.
Pollard, William C. A Career of Defiance:  The Life of Ian Smith, Agusan River Publishing Co., 1992.  Topeka, KS.
McLaughlin, John . "Ian Smith and the Future of Zimbabwe," The National Review, October 30, 1981, pp. 2168–70.
Facts on File, 1984 ed., p. 574.

References

Defunct political parties in Zimbabwe
Rhodesia
Conservative parties in Zimbabwe
Political parties in Rhodesia
White nationalism in Zimbabwe
Pro-independence parties
Anti-communist organizations
Political parties established in 1962
Political parties disestablished in 1981
Protestant political parties
White nationalist parties
Right-wing parties
Ethnicity in politics
1962 establishments in Southern Rhodesia
1981 disestablishments in Zimbabwe